Black Rock Harbor is located in Bridgeport, Connecticut on Long Island Sound. The Black Rock Harbor Light on Fayerweather Island marks the entrance to the harbor on its east, while St. Mary's by the Sea forms its western beachhead. Seaside Park runs along the northeastern part of the harbor. The harbor is the mouth of Cedar Creek. It is a protected harbor that developed as a trade port and shipbuilding center in the 18th century. It is now primarily a recreational harbor, having been superseded by the Bridgeport Harbor, which was enlarged by substantial breakwaters in 1907.

St. Mary's by the Sea is a residential walkway along Long Island Sound. Outdoor enthusiasts to enjoy bringing binoculars to watch the birds and wildlife here. There are walkways for power walkers or those looking for a leisurely stroll. The site also holds historic and cultural interest for visitors to explore.

Adjacent to the harbor there is also the neighborhood of Bridgeport also called Black Rock.

See also
David Hawley
Thomas Wheeler House

References

External links

Ports and harbors of Connecticut
Geography of Bridgeport, Connecticut
Long Island Sound
Transportation in Fairfield County, Connecticut
Tourist attractions in Bridgeport, Connecticut